Joe Pearson may refer to:

 Joe Pearson (footballer) (1877–1946), English footballer
 Joe Pearson (politician), member of the Indiana House of Representatives

See also
 Joseph Pearson (disambiguation)